Cristiane Brasil Francisco, commonly known as Cristiane Brasil (born 21 December 1973), is a Brazilian lawyer and politician. Former member of the Brazilian Labor Party (PTB), had been Federal Deputy, representing the state of Rio de Janeiro between 2015 and 2019, and was nominated as Minister of Labour in January 2018, but the Federal Justice suspended the take up of office.

Biography
Born in Petrópolis, mountain region of the state of Rio de Janeiro, Cristiane Brasil graduated in Law in the Catholic University of Petrópolis. In 2005, took office as city councillor for the first time, being reelected for two more terms. In 2009, took office as City Special Secretary of Healthy Aging and Life Quality of Rio de Janeiro. In the 2014 state elections, was elected federal deputy with 81,817 votes.

She voted favorable to the impeachment proceedings against Dilma Rousseff, to the Bill of Ceiling of Public Spendings and the outsourcing for all activities, and to the Labor Reform. On August and October 2017, Cristiane voted to reject two complaint from the former Prosecutor General Rodrigo Janot against president Michel Temer, successfully archiving both.

Cristiane was nominated by president Temer to the Ministry of Employment after the resignation of Ronaldo Nogueira, but Justice forbade her to assume. On 20 January, Justice Humberto Martins, Deputy Chief Justice of the Superior Court of Justice, granted an injunction from the Attorney General of the Union Grace Mendonça, authorizing Brasil's inauguration, scheduled for 22 January 2018. In the late night of 22 January, President of the Supreme Federal Court, Cármen Lúcia, granted a petition from Labour Independent Lawyers Movement (MATI), suspending, again, her inauguration.

Notes

References

External links 

 

1973 births
Living people
Members of the Chamber of Deputies (Brazil) from Rio de Janeiro (state)
Brazilian Labour Party (current) politicians
People from Petrópolis
21st-century Brazilian women politicians